Minuscule 9 (in the Gregory-Aland numbering), ε 279 (Soden), is a Greek minuscule manuscript of the New Testament, on parchment. According to the colophon it was written in 1167 which is confirmed palaeographically as belonging to the 12th century.

Description 

The codex contains the complete text of the four Gospels, on 298 parchment leaves. The text is written in one column per page, 20 lines per page, size of text has only 16.4 by 11 cm.

There is also another division according to the Ammonian Sections (in Mark 234 sections, the last in 16:8), whose numbers are given at the margin, no references to the Eusebian Canons.

It has also liturgical books with hagiographies (Synaxarion and Menologion), and pictures.

The style is rather barbarous.

Text 

The Greek text of the codex is a representative of the Byzantine text-type. Hermann von Soden classified it to the textual family Kx. Aland placed it in Category V.

According to the Claremont Profile Method it represents Kx in Luke 1 and Luke 20. In Luke 10 it has mixed Byzantine text.

In John 1:29 it lacks phrase ο Ιωαννης along with manuscripts Sinaiticus, Alexandrinus, Vaticanus, Cyprius, Campianus, Petropolitanus Purpureus, Vaticanus 354, Nanianus, Macedoniensis, Sangallensis, Koridethi, Petropolitanus, Athous Lavrensis, 045, 047, 0141, 8, 565, 1192;

History 

According to the colophon it was written ωρα γ της ημερας, πολευοντος ζ ηλεου δι επων. "ζ ηλεου" means seventh sun.

It was written when "Manuel Porphyrogennetus was ruler of Constantinople, Amauri of Jerusalem, William II of Sicily".

This codex was used by Robert Estienne in his Editio Regia (1550), in which was designated by him as ιβ'. It was in private hands and belonged to Peter Stella (about 1570). It became a part of collection of Kuster (Kuster's Paris 3).

It was examined and described by Montfaucon and Wettstein. Scholz collated Matthew 1-8; Mark 1-4; John 4-8. It was examined and described by Paulin Martin. C. R. Gregory saw the manuscript in 1885.

The codex is currently located at the Bibliothèque nationale de France (Gr. 83) in Paris.

See also 
 List of New Testament minuscules
 Textual criticism
 Textus Receptus

References

Further reading 

 Bernard de Montfaucon, Bibliotheca Coisliniana olim Segueriana, Paris: Ludovicus Guerin & Carolus Robustel, 1715, p. 305-307.

Greek New Testament minuscules
12th-century biblical manuscripts
Bibliothèque nationale de France collections